Sarmento is a Portuguese-language surname meaning "vine branch". Notable people with the surname include:

Sarmento de Beires (born 1892), Portuguese Army officer and an aviation pioneer
Henrique Sarmento Malvar (born 1957), Microsoft engineer and senior signal processing researcher
Claudio Wanderley Sarmento Neto (born 1982), Brazilian football (soccer) player
Sarmento Rodrigues (1899–1979), naval officer, colonist and professor
Filipe Sarmento (born 1985), Portuguese footballer
Jacob de Castro Sarmento (1692–1762), Portuguese estrangeirado, physician, naturalist, poet and Deist
Julião Sarmento (1948–2021), Portuguese multimedia artist and painter
Luis Sarmento, the Imperial ambassador to Portugal in 1536
Maria do Céu Sarmento, East Timorese politician
Matthew Sarmento (born 1991), Canadian male field hockey player
Raimundo Sarmento (born 1994), also known as Jeca, football player
Maria Olga de Moraes Sarmento da Silveira (1881–1948), Portuguese writer and feminist
Nelson Sarmento Viegas (born 1999), football player

See also
Ponte Almirante Sarmento Rodrigues, road bridge over the Douro, near the village of Barca d'Alva in Guarda District, Portugal
Sarmentose (disambiguation)
Sarmiento (disambiguation)
Sarmientoia
Sarmientola

Portuguese-language surnames

de:Sarmento
fr:Sarmento
it:Sarmento